Poston is an unincorporated community in Florence County, South Carolina, United States. It is located adjacent to South Carolina Highway 51 and U.S. Route 378. The Andrews Subdivision railroad line runs through Poston. The community is flanked by the Great Pee Dee River, and possesses a landing on the river which is partially managed by the South Carolina Department of Natural Resources.

History 
Poston was originally known as Ellison and functioned as a river port on the Great Pee Dee. The name of the hamlet evolved over time as members of the Poston family, headed by brothers John and Andrew who moved to the region from Buncombe County, North Carolina, began to proliferate the area (formerly part of Marion County). The community was eventually absorbed by Florence County due to issues with transportation between Poston and the county seat of Marion County.

In 1914, the locale gained a railroad junction which spurred great economic growth through the creation of new businesses and jobs. However, locals took issue with the idea of a planned repair store in the area. This stopped Poston from growing further, and following the death of Andrew Poston, the community lost its original railroad line and fell into sharp decline.

References 

Unincorporated communities in Florence County, South Carolina
Unincorporated communities in South Carolina